Norman Palmer Andrews (1 May 1899 – 5 November 1971) was an English first-class cricketer who played for Northamptonshire County Cricket Club in six matches in 1922 and 1923.  His highest score of 45* came when playing for Northamptonshire in the match against Essex County Cricket Club.

References

External links
 Cricket Archive Profile

English cricketers
Northamptonshire cricketers
1899 births
1971 deaths